Solinger is a surname. Notable people with the surname include:

Bob Solinger (1925–2014), Canadian ice hockey player 
David Solinger (1906–1996), American lawyer and art collector
Jamie Solinger (born c.1975), American beauty queen
Johnny Solinger (1965–2021), American singer
Rickie Solinger (born 1947), American writer